TV La Verdad (English: Truth TV) is a religious broadcast station of the Philippine-based Christian organization, Members Church of God International (MCGI, Spanish: Miembros Iglesia de Dios Internacional) for Spanish-speaking countries in Central and South America.

TV La Verdad's 24 hours a day, 7 days a week broadcast started in July 2012 via Galaxy 19 satellite. Later, it transferred to the SES-6 satellite which covers Central and South America including other countries in North America, Europe and North Africa.

Its broadcast feed originates from a 48-square meter garage, transformed into a makeshift broadcasting studio in Florianópolis, Santa Catarina, Brazil, sharing space with its affiliate stations TV Verdade and The Truth Channel.

The station carries the 24-hour Spanish broadcast of El Camino Antiguo (English: The Old Path, Tagalog: Ang Dating Daan), the longest-running religious program in the Philippines, hosted by international televangelist Hermano Eli Soriano, the Overall Servant of MCGI.

Satellite Broadcast

Terrestrial free-to-air broadcast
In February 2014, MCGI began its 24/7 free-to-air terrestrial broadcast in El Salvador, the smallest and the most densely populated country in Central America.

References

External links 

Members Church of God International
Television networks in Brazil
Religious television networks